"O.G. Original Gangster" is a song written and performed by American recording artist Ice-T. It was released as a single from the rapper's fourth studio album of the same name. The song was produced by Tracy "Ice-T" Marrow, Shafiq "SLJ" Husayn and Alphonso "DJ Aladdin" Henderson, and released in 1991 via Sire Records. Reaching a peak position of number 7 on the US Billboard Hot Rap Songs, the single remained on the chart for a total of 11 weeks. The track is also appeared on the retrospective Greatest Hits: The Evidence and in the 2004 Xbox video game Def Jam: Fight for NY with Ice-T featuring in the game as himself as a playable character and in the storyline.

Background 
In the song, Ice-T raps about his life before he started rapping.

"O.G. Original Gangster" uses samples from Melvin Bliss' "Synthetic Substitution", Thin Lizzy's "Johnny the Fox Meets Jimmy the Weed", James Brown's "Funky Drummer", Dexter Wansel's "Theme From the Planets", Curtis Mayfield's "Right on for the Darkness" and Ice-T's "6 in the Mornin'".

Track listing

Personnel
 Tracy Lauren Marrow – vocals, lyrics, producer, arranger, executive producer
 Alphonso Henderson – producer
 Charles Andre Glenn – producer
 Shafiq "SLJ" Husayn – producer
 Bilal Bashir – producer
 Eric Garcia – scratches
 Vachik Aghaniantz – mixing
 Dennis "Def-Pea" Parker – recording
 Tim Stedman – design
 Glen E. Friedman – photography
 Jorge Hinojosa – management

Charts

References

External links

1991 songs
1991 singles
Ice-T songs
Sire Records singles
Songs written by Ice-T
Gangsta rap songs